Father Cesare Bonizzi, O.F.M. Cap. (born 15 March 1946), also known as  Frate Cesare and mistakenly as Fratello Metallo ("Brother Metal") – which was also the name of his band, is an Italian Capuchin friar, who was known as a heavy metal singer.
Actually Fratello Metallo ("Brother Metal") is the name that Frate Cesare gave to Heavy Metal, not to himself.

Biography
Bonizzi was born in Offanengo, in the Province of Cremona, Italy. He entered the Capuchin Order in 1975, and subsequently carried out missionary work in the Ivory Coast. After returning to Italy he was ordained a priest in 1983. Since 1990 he has been interested in using music as a means of contemplation and spiritual devotion, and he has released numerous albums in various styles from new age to rock. After seeing Metallica in concert, however, he became passionate about heavy metal as a musical vehicle. According to him, "Metal is the most energetic, vital, deep and true musical language that I know." He currently lives in the convent of Musocco, a district of Milan. In late 2009, he announced that he would no longer perform, because "The devil has separated me from my managers, risked making me break up with my band colleagues and also risked making me break up with my fellow monks. He lifted me up to the point where I become a celebrity and now I want to kill him."

Music
Although Bonizzi's full transformation to heavy metal is only found on Fratello Metallo's 2008 release Misteri, Bonizzi has recorded numerous albums in various musical genres. With his new style of music, which he calls "Metrock" as a combination of metal and rock, he was the opening act at 2008's Gods of Metal, Italy's largest heavy metal festival. Bonizzi performed in full Franciscan habit.

Discography
 Droghe
 Primi Passi
 L'Eucredo
 Il La Cristiano
 Straordinariamente Ovvio
 Maria Ed "Io"
 Come Fiamma
 Vie Crucis
 Fede Ballare
 Assisi Oggi
 Misteri

References

1946 births
Clergy from the Province of Cremona
Living people
Capuchins
Roman Catholic missionaries in Ivory Coast
Italian Roman Catholic missionaries
Franciscan missionaries
Italian heavy metal singers
Christian metal musicians
20th-century Italian Roman Catholic priests
21st-century Italian Roman Catholic priests
Italian expatriates in Ivory Coast
Musicians from the Province of Cremona